Coast Guard Air Station Astoria was established August 14, 1964 at Astoria Regional Airport in Warrenton, Oregon, United States.

The unit houses 67 active duty, 24 reserve duty and one civilian personnel. The unit operates three Sikorsky MH-60 Jayhawk helicopters. According to a 2003 press release the unit's annual budget is $1,107,051. The unit's functions include search and rescue, law enforcement, aids to navigation support, and environmental protection.

Air Station Astoria served as one of the filming locations for the movie The Guardian (2006).

On April 28, 2017, the Coast Guard announced it would base two Sentinel-class cutters in Astoria, in 2021.

Aircraft historically operated by CGAS Astoria
 Sikorsky HH-52A Seaguard
 Sikorsky HH-3F Pelican
 Dassault HU-25A Falcon

References

External links
 

United States Coast Guard Air Stations
Military installations in Oregon
Transportation in Clatsop County, Oregon
Buildings and structures in Astoria, Oregon
1964 establishments in Oregon